The 1920 United States Senate elections were elections for the United States Senate that coincided with the presidential election of Warren G. Harding. The 32 seats of Class 3 were contested in regular elections, and special elections were held to fill vacancies. Democrat Woodrow Wilson's unpopularity allowed Republicans to win races across the country, winning ten seats from the Democrats and providing them with an overwhelming 59-to-37 majority. The Republican landslide was so vast that Democrats lost over half of the seats that were contested this year and failed to win a single race outside the South.

Since the passage of the Seventeenth Amendment, these elections were the closest when the winning party in almost every Senate election mirrored the winning party for their state in the presidential election, with Kentucky being the only Senate race to not mirror their presidential result. No other Senate election cycle in a presidential year would come close to repeating this feat until 2016, in which the result of every Senate race mirrored the corresponding state's result in the presidential election. Coincidentally, that election cycle involved the same class of Senate seats, Class 3.

This is one of only five occasions where 10 or more Senate seats changed party in an election, with the other occasions being in 1932, 1946, 1958, and 1980.

This number rose to 60, the highest number of seats the Republicans have ever held, after Democrat senator Josiah O. Wolcott of Delaware accepted an offer from Republican governor William D. Denney to become Chancellor of the Delaware Court of Chancery, allowing Denney to name Republican T. Coleman du Pont to replace Wolcott, a seat du Pont held until the next election, in which both a special election was held for the remainder of the term and a regular election was held as the seat was normally up then, both of which du Pont lost narrowly to Democrat Thomas F. Bayard Jr.. In addition, the 22 seat majority is the largest majority that the Republicans have achieved in any election since.

Gains, losses, and holds

Retirements
Two Republicans and four Democrats retired instead of seeking re-election.

Defeats
Ten Democrats and one Republican sought re-election but lost in the primary or general election.

Change in composition

Before the elections

Elections result

Race summary

Special elections during the 66th Congress 

In these special elections, the winner was seated during 1920 or before March 4, 1921; ordered by election date.

Elections leading to the 67th Congress 

In these general elections, the winners were elected for the term beginning March 4, 1921; ordered by state.

All of the elections involved the Class 3 seats.

Closest races 
Nine races had a margin of victory under 10%:

The tipping point state is Colorado with a margin of 15.2%.

Alabama

Alabama (regular)

Alabama (special)

Arizona

Arkansas

California

Colorado

Connecticut

Florida

Georgia

Idaho

Illinois

Indiana

Iowa

Kansas

Kentucky

Louisiana

Maryland

Missouri

Nevada

New Hampshire

New York

North Carolina

North Dakota

Ohio

Oklahoma

Oregon

Pennsylvania

South Carolina

South Dakota

Utah

Vermont

Virginia (special)

Washington

Wisconsin

See also
 1920 United States elections
 1920 United States presidential election
1920 United States gubernatorial elections
 1920 United States House of Representatives elections
 66th United States Congress
 67th United States Congress

Notes

References